Xosé Manuel Hixinio Beiras Torrado (born 7 April 1936) is a Galician politician, economist, writer and intellectual. He is professor of Structural Economy at the Faculty of Economic Sciences of the University of Santiago de Compostela. He is a former member of the National Council of the Galician Nationalist Bloc (BNG in the Galician acronym), he is currently the leader of Renewal–Nationalist Brotherhood, an independentist political party. He formerly had representation in the Galician parliament.

Academic life
Beiras graduated with a law degree in 1957 from the University of Santiago de Compostela. That same year, he moved to Paris to study economics at the University of the Sorbonne, where he also studied French language and literature. In 1960, he taught his first course on political economy at the Complutense University of Madrid and a year later, in 1961, he moved to London to attend the London School of Economics, where he continued to advance his studies.

During the 1966/1967 academic year, Beiras received a scholarship from the Juan March Foundation, which allowed him to attend a research course with François Perroux at the Institut de science économique appliquée (now ) in Paris. During his time in France, he became acquainted with Robèrt Lafont's concept of "internal colonialism", a concept that would remain embedded in his political discourse for years to come.

He was the vice-director of the Revista de Economia da Galiza ("Galician Journal of Economics") from 1963 to 1968. In 1967, he was granted a prize from Casa Galiza in New York City for his book O problema do desenrolo na Galiza rural (The Problem of Development in Rural Galicia). In 1968 he moved back to Galicia for good, taking up a job as a lecturer in economy at the University of Santiago de Compostela. In 1970, while spending a few months in Madrid, he published his doctoral dissertation under the title Estructura y problemas de la poblacion gallega ("Structure and Problems of the Galician Population"). His dissertation earned him an Extraordinary Doctoral Prize, as well as a position as associate professor in structural economy.

In 1972 he published one of his key works, O atraso económico da Galiza ("The Economic Underdevelopment of Galicia"), and was offered the post of temporary dean, which he finally accepted in 1975. While still publishing books, he directed a research project on the modernization of Galian agriculture sponsored by the Pedro Barrié de la Maza foundation and the University of Montpellier. In 1977 he was invited to join the Real Academia Galega (The Royal Galician Academy) – the institution he would leave in 1982 as he disagreed with the linguistic policies endorsed by the academy (following the example of Carvalho Calero). In 1980 Beiras became head professor of structural economy at the University of Santiago de Compostela, where he remains today. In the 1980s, he published prolifically, literary works as well as economics and politics, including translations of French classics into Galician.

Life in politics
As a politician he was one of the founding members of the clandestine Galician Socialist Party, in 1963, in Francoist Spain. In 1964 he took on the role of International Relations, a position which would grant him access to a number of European Socialist organizations. He would eventually become Secretary General of the party in 1971. Yet, he resigned in 1977 due to the unfavorable results in the first democratic elections of Spain after the death of Franco.

In 1982 Beiras tookpart in the foundation of the BNG (Galician Nationalist Bloc) as member of the National Directive Board. In 1985 he gained a seat at the Galician Parliament and gradually became the indisputable leader of Galician nationalism. Beiras took the party to its best results ever in 1997, receiving the support of almost 25 per cent of the electorate. In 2004 he established a number of pacts with nationalist parties from Catalonia and Basque Country in order to gain greater media coverage and, most importantly, joint political weight in the Spanish Parliament. That same year, 2004, he decided to renounce his candidacy for the Galician presidency for the next election and gradually leave politics. However, being unhappy with the internal dynamics of BNG shortly after he yielded leadership, he fostered a critical organization within it – the Encontro Irmandinho – in order to promote party transparency and internal democracy.

After abandoning the first line of BNG, Beiras has been actively involved in anti-globalization movements such as Altermundo and the World Social Forum (WSF). In 2008 he was invited to join the council of the WSF. Beiras is also a co-founder of the politically oriented foundation Galiza Sempre, and its president since 1999.

Writing
Beiras has published a large number of books and articles in politics and economics, but as an intellectual he has also shown an interest in literature and music (he is an accomplished pianist). He contributed to the creation of publishing houses Editorial Galaxia and Edicións Laiovento. He is a regular columnist of the newspaper Galicia Hoxe. Occasionally he publishes in the newspaper A Nosa Terra and in the prestigious Galician cultural journal Grial.

Selected works
 Antígona (translation into Galician of Jean Anouilh's Antigone, with Xosé Luís Franco Grande), 1959
 O problema do desenrolo na Galiza rural, 1967
 Introducción á economía galega de hoxe (Beiras et al.), 1969
 Estructura y problemas de la población gallega, 1970
 O atraso económico de Galiza, 1972
 A Galiza rural na encrucillada, 1975
 Contaminación industrial e desenvolvimento, 1975
 O atraso e Nós. Aportación para un debate encol o atraso económico, 1982
 Dende Galiza: Marx. Homenaxe a Marx no 1º centenario da súa morte (Beiras et al.), 1984
 Por unha Galiza liberada, 1984
 Constitución española e nacionalismo galego: unha visión socialista, 1985
 Cartas a un amigo alemán (translation into Galician of Albert Camus' Lettres à un ami allemand), 1987
 Os xustos (translation into Galician of Albert Camus' Les Justes), 1987
 Prosas de combate e maldicer, 1991
 O estado da nación, 1996
 A poboación galega no século XX (with A. López Rodríguez), 1999

See also
 Galician nationalism
 Galician Nationalist Bloc

References

 Beramendi, J. and Núñez Seixas, X.M. (1996): O nacionalismo galego, A Nosa Terra, Vigo
 Fernández Baz, M.A., (2003): A formación do nacionalismo galego contemporáneo (1963–1984), Laiovento
 Fernán Vello, M.A. and Pillado Maior, F. (2004): A estrela na palabra. Novas conversas con Xosé Manuel Beiras, Edicións Laiovento – Espiral Maior, Santiago de Compostela
 Rodríguez Polo, X. R. (2009): Ramón Piñeiro e a estratexia do galeguismo''. Xerais, Vigo.

External links
Encontro Irmandinho
Bloque Nacionalista Galego
Fundación Galiza Sempre
Beira's personal section in Altermundo.

1936 births
Living people
People from Santiago de Compostela
Spanish economists
University of Paris alumni
Alumni of the London School of Economics
Politicians from Galicia (Spain)
Marxian economists
Galician Nationalist Bloc politicians
Members of the 2nd Parliament of Galicia
Members of the 3rd Parliament of Galicia
Members of the 4th Parliament of Galicia
Members of the 5th Parliament of Galicia
Members of the 6th Parliament of Galicia
Members of the 9th Parliament of Galicia
Spanish expatriates in France